James William Keenan (February 10, 1856 – September 21, 1926) was a professional baseball catcher. He played most of his major league career with the Cincinnati Red Stockings of the American Association and later National League, after they became the Cincinnati Reds.

Keenan made his debut at age 17 with the New Haven Elm Citys of the National Association, but did not establish himself in the majors until 1884, when he became the regular catcher for the Indianapolis Hoosiers. He stayed in Indianapolis to start the 1885 season, with the city's entry in the Western League, but the league quickly folded, and he was acquired by the Detroit Wolverines.

Before he played a game for Detroit, however, Keenan jumped to the Red Stockings, where he split time at catcher with Pop Snyder. Over the next four seasons, he would split catching duties for the Red Stockings with Kid Baldwin. In 1890 and 1891, he backed up Jerry Harrington.

Sources

Major League Baseball catchers
New Haven Elm Citys players
Albany (minor league baseball) players
Auburn (minor league baseball) players
Buffalo Bisons (NL) players
Pittsburgh Alleghenys players
Indianapolis Hoosiers (AA) players
Cincinnati Red Stockings (AA) players
Cincinnati Reds players
Hornellsville Hornells players
Indianapolis Hoosiers (minor league) players
Baseball players from New Haven, Connecticut
19th-century baseball players
1858 births
1926 deaths